is a Japanese female mixed martial arts (MMA) fighter. She previously fought as a flyweight in the Valkyrie promotion and was the only Valkyrie Flyweight Champion. She later fought for Jewels and last competed for Deep.

Tamada was once ranked as the #6 female atomweight (96-106 lb) fighter in the world according to the Unified Women's Mixed Martial Arts Rankings.

Grappling career
She managed to make it to the finals of a Smackgirl grappling tournament on  where she lost to Yasuko Mogi. Her last grappling bout was at Gi Grappling 2008.

Mixed martial arts career
Tamada made her professional debut in MMA with a split decision victory against Maho Muranami. Her next fights resulted in four losses and two draws. She rebounded with seven consecutive wins. After a draw in Valkyrie's first event, she won her next three fights. At Valkyrie 06, she became Valkyrie Flyweight Champion by defeating Naoko Omuro in her most impressive performance to date.

She was defeated by unanimous decision.

She was defeated by split decision.

On , Tamada faced Naho Sugiyama in a non-title rematch at Jewels 19th Ring in Osaka, Japan. She was defeated by majority decision.

She defeated Omuro by technical submission due to an armbar in the second round.

She defeated Takano by unanimous decision.

She defeated Seki by unanimous decision.

Tamada made her US debut for Invicta Fighting Championships on September 6, 2014. She faced Michelle Waterson for the Invicta FC Atomweight Championship. Tamada lost the fight via TKO in the third round which was the first time she had ever lost via TKO.

Mixed martial arts record

|-
| Loss
| align=center| 17–13–3
| Reina Kobayashi
| Decision (split)
| DEEP Nagoya Impact: Kobudo Fight 28
| 
| align=center| 2
| align=center| 5:00
| Kasugai, Aichi  Japan
| 
|-
| Loss
| align=center| 17–12–3
| Aya Murakami
| Submission (armbar)
| DEEP Tokyo Impact 2021 ~2nd Round~
| 
| align=center| 1
| align=center| 3:33
| Tokyo, Japan
| 
|-
| Loss
| align=center| 17–11–3
| Mizuki Furuse
| Decision (unanimous)
| Deep Jewels 28
| 
| align=center| 2
| align=center| 5:00
| Tokyo, Japan
| 
|-
| Win
| align=center| 17–10–3
| Kotori Tamiya
| Decision (unanimous)
| Deep Jewels 26
| 
| align=center| 2
| align=center| 5:00
| Tokyo, Japan
| 
|-
| Win
| align=center| 16–10–3
| Madoka Ishibashi
| Decision (unanimous)
| Deep Jewels 23
| 
| align=center| 2
| align=center| 5:00
| Tokyo, Japan
| 
|-
| Loss
| align=center| 15–10–3
| Kanna Asakura
| Decision (unanimous)
| VTJ 7th
| 
| align=center| 3
| align=center| 3:00
| Urayasu, Chiba, Japan
| 
|-
| Loss
| align=center| 15–9–3
| Michelle Waterson
| TKO (knee & punches)
| Invicta FC 8: Waterson vs. Tamada
| 
| align=center| 3
| align=center|  4:58
| Kansas City, Missouri, United States
| 
|-
| Win
| align=center| 15–8–3
| Yukiko Seki
| Decision (unanimous)
| Deep Jewels 1
| 
| align=center| 2
| align=center| 5:00
| Kabukicho, Tokyo, Japan
| 
|-
| Win
| align=center| 14–8–3
| Satomi Takano
| Decision (unanimous)
| Jewels 22nd Ring
| 
| align=center| 2
| align=center| 5:00
| Koto, Tokyo, Japan
| 
|-
| Win
| align=center| 13–8–3
| Naoko Omuro
| Technical Submission (armbar)
| Jewels 20th Ring
| 
| align=center| 2
| align=center| 1:05
| Koto, Tokyo, Japan
| 
|-
| Loss
| align=center| 12–8–3
| Naho Sugiyama
| Decision (majority)
| Jewels 19th Ring
| 
| align=center| 2
| align=center| 5:00
| Taisho-ku, Osaka, Japan
| 
|-
| Loss
| align=center| 12–7–3
| Sachiko Yamamoto
| Decision (split)
| Jewels 17th Ring
| 
| align=center| 2
| align=center| 5:00
| Kabukicho, Tokyo, Japan
| 
|-
| Loss
| align=center| 12–6–3
| Kikuyo Ishikawa
| Decision (unanimous)
| Jewels 16th Ring
| 
| align=center| 2
| align=center| 5:00
| Koto, Tokyo, Japan
| 
|-
| Loss
| align=center| 12–5–3
| Naho Sugiyama
| Decision (unanimous)
| Valkyrie 08
| 
| align=center| 3
| align=center| 3:00
| Koto, Tokyo, Japan
| 
|-
| Win
| align=center| 12–4–3
| Naoko Omuro
| Decision (unanimous)
| Valkyrie 06
| 
| align=center| 3
| align=center| 5:00
| Koto, Tokyo, Japan
| 
|-
| Win
| align=center| 11–4–3
| Yukiko Seki
| Decision (unanimous)
| Valkyrie 05
| 
| align=center| 3
| align=center| 3:00
| Koto, Tokyo, Japan
| 
|-
| Win
| align=center| 10–4–3
| Fujuko Hamada
| Decision (unanimous)
| Valkyrie 04
| 
| align=center| 3
| align=center| 3:00
| Koto, Tokyo, Japan
| 
|-
| Win
| align=center| 9–4–3
| Misaki Takimoto
| Decision (unanimous)
| Jewels 2nd Ring
| 
| align=center| 2
| align=center| 5:00
| Kabukicho, Tokyo, Japan
| 
|-
| Draw
| align=center| 8–4–3
| Naoko Omuro
| Draw (majority)
| Valkyrie 01
| 
| align=center| 3
| align=center| 3:00
| Koto, Tokyo, Japan
| 
|-
| Win
| align=center| 8–4–2
| Fukuko Hamada
| Decision (unanimous)
| Deep: 36 Impact
| 
| align=center| 2
| align=center| 5:00
| Osaka, Japan
| 
|-
| Win
| align=center| 7–4–2
| Kayo Nagayasu
| Decision (majority)
| Shooto: 6/26 in Kitazawa Town Hall
| 
| align=center| 2
| align=center| 5:00
| Setagaya, Tokyo, Japan
| 
|-
| Win
| align=center| 6–4–2
| Maho Muranami
| Decision (unanimous)
| Smackgirl: Starting Over
| 
| align=center| 2
| align=center| 5:00
| Bunkyo, Tokyo, Japan
| 
|-
| Win
| align=center| 5–4–2
| Yuka Okumura
| Submission (rear-naked choke)
| Zst: Swat! Rx1
| 
| align=center| 1
| align=center| 7:34
| Tokyo, Japan
| 
|-
| Win
| align=center| 4–4–2
| Masako Yoshida
| Decision (unanimous)
| Smackgirl: Summerfest 2007
| 
| align=center| 2
| align=center| 5:00
| Tokyo, Japan
| 
|-
| Win
| align=center| 3–4–2
| Kayo Nagayasu
| Decision (unanimous)
| Shooto: Battle Mix Tokyo 2
| 
| align=center| 2
| align=center| 5:00
| Tokyo, Japan
| 
|-
| Win
| align=center| 2–4–2
| Yukiko Seki
| Decision (unanimous)
| Smackgirl: Legend of Extreme Women
| 
| align=center| 2
| align=center| 5:00
| Bunkyo, Tokyo, Japan
| 
|-
| Loss
| align=center| 1–4–2
| Ayumi Saito
| Decision (unanimous)
| Smackgirl: Women Hold Their Ground
| 
| align=center| 2
| align=center| 5:00
| Bunkyo, Tokyo, Japan
| 
|-
| Loss
| align=center| 1–3–2
| Masako Yoshida
| Decision (majority)
| G-Shooto: G-Shooto 06
| 
| align=center| 2
| align=center| 5:00
| Setagaya, Tokyo, Japan
| 
|-
| Draw
| align=center| 1–2–2
| Kayo Nagayasu
| Draw
| G-Shooto: G-Shooto 05
| 
| align=center| 2
| align=center| 5:00
| Kabukicho, Tokyo, Japan
| 
|-
| Draw
| align=center| 1–2–1
| Eri Kaneya
| Draw
| G-Shooto: G-Shooto 04
| 
| align=center| 2
| align=center| 5:00
| Kabukicho, Tokyo, Japan
| 
|-
| Loss
| align=center| 1–2–0
| Masako Yoshida
| Decision (split)
| Smackgirl: Shimokita Experiment League
| 
| align=center| 2
| align=center| 5:00
| Setagaya, Tokyo, Japan
| 
|-
| Loss
| align=center| 1–1–0
| Yuki Furudate
| Decision (split)
| G-Shooto: Plus03
| 
| align=center| 2
| align=center| 5:00
| Setagaya, Tokyo, Japan
| 
|-
| Win
| align=center| 1–0–0
| Maho Muranami
| Decision (split)
| G-Shooto: Plus02
| 
| align=center| 2
| align=center| 5:00
| Setagaya, Tokyo, Japan
|

Championships
 Valkyrie Flyweight Champion (2010)

See also
 List of female mixed martial artists

References

External links
 
 Yasuko Tamada at Invicta FC (archived)
 Yasuko Tamada Awakening Profile
 Profile at Fightergirls.com
 Jewels' profile 
 Official blog 

1967 births
Sportspeople from Tokyo
Living people
Japanese female mixed martial artists
Atomweight mixed martial artists